Lead glass, commonly called crystal, is a variety of glass in which lead replaces the calcium content of a typical potash glass. Lead glass contains typically 18–40% (by weight) lead(II) oxide (PbO), while modern lead crystal, historically also known as flint glass due to the original silica source, contains a minimum of 24% PbO. Lead glass is often desirable for a variety of uses due to its clarity.  In marketing terms it is often called crystal glass.

The term lead crystal is, technically, not an accurate term to describe lead glass, because glass lacks a crystalline structure and is instead an amorphous solid. The use of the term lead crystal or just "crystal" remains popular for historical and commercial reasons, and because "lead" sounds toxic to consumers. It is retained from the Venetian word cristallo to describe the rock crystal (quartz) imitated by Murano glassmakers. This naming convention has been maintained to the present day to describe decorative hollow-ware.

Lead crystal glassware was formerly used to store and serve drinks, but due to the health risks of lead, this has become rare. One alternative material is modern crystal glass, in which barium oxide, zinc oxide, or potassium oxide are employed instead of lead oxide.

In the European Union, labeling of "crystal" products is regulated by Council Directive 69/493/EEC, which defines four categories, depending on the chemical composition and properties of the material. Only glass products containing at least 24% of lead oxide may be referred to as "lead crystal". Products with less lead oxide, or glass products with other metal oxides used in place of lead oxide, must be labeled "crystalline" or "crystal glass".

Properties
The addition of lead oxide to glass raises its refractive index and lowers its working temperature and viscosity. The attractive optical properties of lead glass result from the high content of the heavy metal lead. The high atomic number of lead also raises the density of the material, since lead has a very high atomic weight of 207.2, versus 40.08 for calcium.

The brilliance of lead crystal relies on the high refractive index caused by the lead content. Ordinary glass has a refractive (n) of 1.5, while the addition of lead produces a range up to 1.7 or 1.8. This heightened refractive index also correlates with increased dispersion, which measures the degree to which a medium separates light into its component wavelengths, thus producing a spectrum, just as a prism does. Crystal cutting techniques exploit these properties to create a brilliant, sparkling effect as each cut facet in cut glass reflects and transmits light through the object. The high refractive index is useful for lens making, since a given focal length can be achieved with a thinner lens. However, the dispersion must be corrected by other components of the lens system if it is to be achromatic.

The viscosity of glass varies radically with temperature, but that of lead glass is roughly two orders of magnitude lower than that of ordinary soda glasses across working temperature ranges (up to ). From the glassmaker's perspective, this results in two practical developments. First, lead glass may be worked at a lower temperature, leading to its use in enamelling, and second, clear vessels may be made without trapped air bubbles with less difficulty than ordinary glasses, allowing the manufacture of perfectly clear, flawless objects.

When tapped, lead crystal makes a ringing sound, unlike ordinary glasses. Consumers still rely on this property to distinguish it from cheaper glasses. Since the potassium ions are bound more tightly in a lead-silica matrix than in a soda–lime glass, the former absorbs more energy when struck. This causes the lead crystal to oscillate, thereby producing its characteristic sound. Lead also increases the solubility of tin, copper, and antimony, leading to its use in colored enamels and glazes. The low viscosity of lead glass melt is the reason for typically high lead oxide content in the glass solders.

The presence of lead is used in glasses absorbing gamma radiation and X-rays, used in radiation shielding as a form of lead shielding (e.g. in cathode ray tubes, thus lowering the exposure of the viewer to soft X-rays).  In particle physics, the combination of the low radiation length resulting from the high density and presence of heavy nuclei with the high refractive index which leads to both pronounced Cherenkov radiation and containment of the Cherenkov light by total internal reflection makes lead glass one of the prominent tools for photon detection by means of electromagnetic showers.

The high ionic radius of the Pb2+ ion renders it highly immobile in the matrix and hinders the movement of other ions; lead glasses therefore have high electrical resistance, about two orders of magnitude higher than soda–lime glass (108.5 vs 106.5 Ohm·cm, DC at ). Lead-containing glass is frequently used in light fixtures.

History
Lead may be introduced into glass either as an ingredient of the primary melt or added to preformed leadless glass or frit. The lead oxide used in lead glass could be obtained from a variety of sources. In Europe, galena, lead sulfide, was widely available, which could be smelted to produce metallic lead. The lead metal would be calcined to form lead oxide by roasting it and scraping off the litharge. In the medieval period lead metal could be obtained through recycling from abandoned Roman sites and plumbing, even from church roofs. Metallic lead was demanded in quantity for silver cupellation, and the resulting litharge could be used directly by glassmakers. Lead was also used for ceramic lead glazes. This material interdependence suggests a close working relationship between potters, glassmakers, and metalworkers.

Glasses with lead oxide content first appeared in Mesopotamia, the birthplace of the glass industry. The earliest known example is a blue glass fragment from Nippur dated to 1400 BC containing 3.66% PbO. Glass is mentioned in clay tablets from the reign of Assurbanipal (668–631 BC), and a recipe for lead glaze appears in a Babylonian tablet of 1700 BC. A red sealing-wax cake found in the Burnt Palace at Nimrud, from the early 6th century BC, contains 10% PbO. These low values suggest that lead oxide may not have been consciously added, and was certainly not used as the primary fluxing agent in ancient glasses.

Lead glass also occurs in Han-period China (206 BC – 220 AD). There, it was cast to imitate jade, both for ritual objects such as big and small figures, as well as jewellery and a limited range of vessels. Since glass first occurs at such a late date in China, it is thought that the technology was brought along the Silk Road by glassworkers from the Middle East. The fundamental compositional difference between Western silica-natron glass and the unique Chinese lead glass, however, may indicate an autonomous development.

In medieval and early modern Europe, lead glass was used as a base in coloured glasses, specifically in mosaic tesserae, enamels, stained-glass painting, and bijouterie, where it was used to imitate precious stones. Several textual sources describing lead glass survive. In the late 11th-early 12th century, Schedula Diversarum Artium (List of Sundry Crafts), the author known as "Theophilus Presbyter" describes its use as imitation gemstone, and the title of a lost chapter of the work mentions the use of lead in glass. The 12–13th century pseudonymous "Heraclius" details the manufacture of lead enamel and its use for window painting in his De coloribus et artibus Romanorum (Of Hues and Crafts of the Romans). This refers to lead glass as "Jewish glass", perhaps indicating its transmission to Europe. A manuscript preserved in the Biblioteca Marciana, Venice, describes the use of lead oxide in enamels and includes recipes for calcining lead to form the oxide. Lead glass was ideally suited for enamelling vessels and windows owing to its lower working temperature than the forest glass of the body.

Antonio Neri devoted book four of his L’Arte Vetraria ("The Art of Glass-making", 1612) to lead glass. In this first systematic treatise on glass, he again refers to the use of lead glass in enamels, glassware, and for the imitation of precious stones. Christopher Merrett translated this into English in 1662 (The Art of Glass), paving the way for the production of English lead crystal glass by George Ravenscroft.

George Ravenscroft (1618–1681) was the first to produce clear lead crystal glassware on an industrial scale. The son of a merchant with close ties to Venice, Ravenscroft had the cultural and financial resources necessary to revolutionise the glass trade, setting the basis from which England overtook Venice and Bohemia as the centre of the glass industry in the eighteenth and nineteenth centuries. With the aid of Venetian glassmakers, especially da Costa, and under the auspices of the Worshipful Company of Glass Sellers of London, Ravenscroft sought to find an alternative to Venetian cristallo. His use of flint as the silica source has led to the term flint glass to describe these crystal glasses, despite his later switch to sand. At first, his glasses tended to crizzle, developing a network of small cracks destroying its transparency, which was eventually overcome by replacing some of the potash flux with lead oxide to the melt, up to 30%. Crizzling results from the destruction of the glass network by an excess of alkali, and may be caused by excess humidity as well as inherent defects in glass composition. He was granted a protective patent in 1673, where production moved from his glasshouse in the precinct of the Savoy, London, to the seclusion of Henley-on-Thames. In 1676, having apparently overcome the crizzling problem, Ravenscroft was granted the use of a raven's head seal as a guaranty of quality. In 1681, the year of his death, the patent expired and operations quickly developed among several firms, where by 1696 twenty-seven of the eighty-eight glasshouses in England, especially at London and Bristol, were producing flint glass containing 30–35% PbO.

At this period, glass was sold by weight, and the typical forms were rather heavy and solid with minimal decoration. Such was its success on the international market, however, that in 1746, the British Government imposed a lucrative tax by weight. Rather than drastically reduce the lead content of their glass, manufacturers responded by creating highly decorated, smaller, more delicate forms, often with hollow stems, known to collectors today as Excise glasses. In 1780, the government granted Ireland free trade in glass without taxation. English labour and capital then shifted to Dublin and Belfast, and new glassworks specialising in cut glass were installed in Cork and Waterford. In 1825, the tax was renewed, and gradually the industry declined until the mid-nineteenth century, when the tax was finally repealed.

From the 18th century, English lead glass became popular throughout Europe, and was ideally suited to the new taste for wheel-cut glass decoration perfected on the Continent owing to its relatively soft properties. In Holland, local engraving masters such as David Wolff and Frans Greenwood stippled imported English glassware, a style that remained popular through the eighteenth century. Such was its popularity in Holland that the first Continental production of lead-crystal glass began there, probably as the result of imported English workers. Imitating lead-crystal à la façon d’Angleterre presented technical difficulties, as the best results were obtained with covered pots in a coal-fired furnace, a particularly English process requiring specialised cone-furnaces. Towards the end of the eighteenth century, lead-crystal glass was being produced in France, Hungary, Germany, and Norway. By 1800, Irish lead crystal had overtaken lime-potash glasses on the Continent, and traditional glassmaking centres in Bohemia began to focus on colored glasses rather than compete directly against it.

The development of lead glass continued through the twentieth century, when in 1932 scientists at the Corning Glassworks, New York State, developed a new lead glass of high optical clarity. This became the focus of Steuben Glass Works, a division of Corning, which produced decorative vases, bowls, and glasses in Art Deco style. Lead-crystal continues to be used in industrial and decorative applications.

Lead glazes
The fluxing and refractive properties valued for lead glass also make it attractive as a pottery or ceramic glaze. Lead glazes first appear in first century BC to first century AD Roman wares, and occur nearly simultaneously in China. They were very high in lead, 45–60% PbO, with a very low alkali content, less than 2%. From the Roman period, they remained popular through the Byzantine and Islamic periods in the Near East, on pottery vessels and tiles throughout medieval Europe, and up to the present day. In China, similar glazes were used from the twelfth century for colored enamels on stoneware, and on porcelain from the fourteenth century.
These could be applied in three different ways. Lead could be added directly to a ceramic body in the form of a lead compound in suspension, either from galena (PbS), red lead (Pb3O4), white lead (2PbCO3·Pb(OH)2), or lead oxide (PbO). The second method involves mixing the lead compound with silica, which is then placed in suspension and applied directly. The third method involves fritting the lead compound with silica, powdering the mixture, and suspending and applying it. The method used on a particular vessel may be deduced by analysing the interaction layer between the glaze and the ceramic body microscopically.

Tin-opacified glazes appear in Iraq in the eighth century AD. Originally containing 1–2% PbO; by the eleventh century high-lead glazes had developed, typically containing 20–40% PbO and 5–12% alkali. These were used throughout Europe and the Near East, especially in Iznik ware, and continue to be used today. Glazes with even-higher lead content occur in Spanish and Italian maiolica, with up to 55% PbO and as low as 3% alkali. Adding lead to the melt allows the formation of tin oxide more readily than in an alkali glaze: tin oxide precipitates into crystals in the glaze as it cools, creating its opacity.

The use of lead glaze has several advantages over alkali glazes in addition to their greater optical refractivity. Lead compounds in suspension may be added directly to the ceramic body. Alkali glazes must first be mixed with silica and fritted prior to use, since they are soluble in water, requiring additional labor. A successful glaze must not crawl, or peel away from the pottery surface upon cooling, leaving areas of unglazed ceramic. Lead reduces this risk by reducing the surface tension of the glaze. It must not craze, forming a network of cracks, caused when the thermal contraction of the glaze and the ceramic body do not match properly. Ideally, the glaze contraction should be 5–15% less than the body contraction, as glazes are stronger under compression than under tension. A high-lead glaze has a linear expansion coefficient of between 5 and 7×10−6/°C, compared to 9 to 10×10−6/°C for alkali glazes. Those of earthenware ceramics vary between 3 and 5×10−6/°C for non-calcareous bodies and 5 to 7×10−6/°C for calcareous clays, or those containing 15–25% CaO. Therefore, the thermal contraction of lead glaze matches that of the ceramic more closely than an alkali glaze, rendering it less prone to crazing. A glaze should also have a low enough viscosity to prevent the formation of pinholes as trapped gasses escape during firing, typically between 900 and 1100 °C, but not so low as to run off. The relatively low viscosity of lead glaze mitigates this issue. It may also have been cheaper to produce than alkali glazes.
Lead glass and glazes have a long and complex history, and continue to play new roles in industry and technology today.

Lead crystal

Lead oxide added to the molten glass gives lead crystal a much higher index of refraction than normal glass, and consequently much greater "sparkle" by increasing specular reflection and the range of angles of total internal reflection. Ordinary glass has a refractive index of n = 1.5; the addition of lead produces an index of refraction of up to 1.7. This higher refractive index also raises the correlated dispersion, the degree to which the glass separates light into its colors, as in a prism. The increases in refractive index and dispersion significantly increase the amount of reflected light and thus the "fire" in the glass.

In cut glass, which has been hand- or machine-cut with facets, the presence of lead also makes the glass softer and easier to cut. Crystal can consist of up to 35% lead, at which point it has the most sparkle.

Makers of lead crystal objects include:

Safety
There is no safe level of lead intake. The WHO officially withdrew its previous safe levels in 2011 after reviewing the available research. Studies on lead safety and lead migration from leaded glass into food from before 2011 will often cite lead tolerable intake levels (PTWI, or provisional tolerable daily intake) greater than zero. Those intake levels are obsolete and should not be treated as health advice.

Several studies have demonstrated that storing food or drink in lead glassware can cause lead to leach into the contents. The amount of lead released increases with the acidity of the substance being stored. Vinegar has been shown to cause more rapid leaching compared to white wine, as vinegar is more acidic. Citrus juices and other acidic drinks leach lead from crystal as effectively as alcoholic beverages.

The amount of lead released into the food or drink increases with the amount of time the vessel is used for storage. In a study performed at North Carolina State University, the amount of lead migration was measured for port wine stored in lead crystal decanters. After two days, lead levels were 89 µg/L (micrograms per liter). After four months, lead levels were between 2,000 and 5,000 µg/L. White wine doubled its lead content within an hour of storage and tripled it within four hours. Some brandy stored in lead crystal for over five years had lead levels around 20,000 µg/L.

Lead leaching decreases with repeated use of a decanter. This finding is "consistent with ceramic chemistry theory, which predicts that leaching of lead from crystal is self-limiting exponentially as a function of increasing distance from the crystal-liquid interface." Daily usage of lead crystalware (without longer-term storage) was found to add up to 14.5 μg of lead from drinking a 350ml cola beverage.

It has been proposed that the historic association of gout with the upper classes in Europe and America was, in part, caused by their extensive use of lead crystal decanters to store fortified wines and whisky. Statistical evidence linking gout to lead poisoning has been correlated.

See also

Steuben Crystal
Waterford Crystal
Edinburgh Crystal
Swarovski
Ajka Crystal
List of indices of refraction
Lead
Hot cell
Val Saint Lambert

References

Glass compositions
Lead(II) compounds